Chile is scheduled to compete at the 2023 Pan American Games in Santiago, Chile from October 20 to November 5, 2023. Chile was the host nation of the games, marking the first time the country hosted the games.  This was Chile's 19th appearance at the Pan American Games, having competed at every edition of the games since the inaugural edition in 1951.

Competitors
The following is the list of number of competitors (per gender) participating at the games per sport/discipline.

Archery

Chile qualified a team of eight athletes (four men and four women) as hosts.

Men

Mixed

Artistic swimming

Chile automatically qualified a full team of nine artistic swimmers as host nation.

Athletics

Chile qualified 42 athletes (21 men and 21 women) as hosts. Besides, Chile qualified 1 extra male athlete after winning one event during the 2021 Junior Pan American Games.

Men
Track & road events

Field events

Combined events – Decathlon

Women
Track & road events

Field events

Combined events – Heptathlon

Badminton

Chile qualified a full team of eight athletes (four men and four women) as hosts.

Men

Women

Mixed

Baseball

Chile qualified a men's team (of 24 athletes) as hosts.

Summary

Basketball

3x3
Chile qualified a men's team (of 4 athletes) and a women's team (of 4 athletes) as hosts.

Summary

5x5

Men's tournament

Chile qualified a men's team (of 12 athletes) as hosts.

Summary

Women's tournament

Chile qualified a women's team (of 12 athletes) as hosts.

Summary

Basque pelota

Chile qualified a full team of 12 athletes (six men and six women) as hosts.

Men

Women

Bowling

Chile qualified a full team of two men and two women as hosts.

Boxing

Chile qualified 13 boxers (seven men and six women) as hosts.

Men

Women

Canoeing

Slalom
Chile qualified a full team of two men and two women as hosts.

Sprint
Chile qualified a total of 13 sprint athletes (six men and seven women).

Men

Women

Cycling

Chile qualified a full team of 34 cyclists (17 men and 17 women) as hosts. Besides, Chile qualified 1 extra cyclist after winning one event during the 2021 Junior Pan American Games.

BMX

Freestyle

Racing

Mountain

Road
Men

Women

Track
Men

Sprint

Pursuit

Keirin

Madison

Omnium

Diving

Chile qualified a full team of ten divers (five men and five women) as hosts.

Men

Women

Equestrian

Chile qualified a full team of four equestrians in Dressage, Eventing and Jumping as hosts.

Dressage

Eventing

Jumping

Fencing

Chile automatically qualified a full team of 18 fencers (nine men and nine women) as the host nation. Jorge Valderrama and Katina Proestakis also qualified after each winning a gold medal at the 2021 Junior Pan American Games in Cali, Colombia. This mean the team size was 20 fencers (ten per gender).

Individual
Men

Women

Team

Field hockey

Chile qualified a men's team (of 16 athletes) and a women's team (of 16 athletes) as hosts.

Summary

Football

Men's tournament

Chile qualified a men's team of 18 athletes automatically as hosts.
Summary

Women's tournament

Chile qualified a women's team of 18 athletes automatically as hosts.
Summary

Golf

Chile qualified a full team of four golfers (two men and two women) as hosts.

Gymnastics

Artistic
Chile qualified a team of ten gymnasts in artistic (five men and five women) as hosts.

Men
Team & Individual Qualification

Qualification Legend: Q = Qualified to apparatus final

Women
Team & Individual Qualification

Qualification Legend: Q = Qualified to apparatus final

Rhythmic
Chile qualified one individual gymnast and five gymnasts for the group event in rhythmic (six women) as hosts.
Individual

Group

Trampoline
Chile will qualify one gymnast in trampoline (one man or one woman) as hosts only
if it has not obtained any of the 11 quotas during qualification.

Handball

Men's tournament

Chile qualified a men's team (of 14 athletes) as hosts.

Summary

Women's tournament

Chile qualified a women's team (of 14 athletes) as hosts.

Summary

Judo

Chile has qualified a full team of fourteen judokas (seven men and seven women) as hots.

Men

Women

Karate

Chile qualified a full team of 12 karatekas (six men and six women) as hosts. Besides, Chile qualified 1 extra karateka after winning one category during the 2021 Junior Pan American Games.

Kumite 

Kata

Modern pentathlon

Chile qualified four modern pentathletes (two men and two women) as hosts.

Roller sports

Figure
Chile qualified a team of two athletes in figure skating (one man and one woman) as hosts.

Speed
Chile qualified a team of four athletes (two men and two women) in speed skating as hosts.

Men

Women

Skateboarding
Chile qualified a team of four athletes (two men and two women) in skateboarding as hosts.

Men

Women

Rowing

Chile qualified a team of 16 athletes (eight men and eight women) as hosts.

Men

Women

Mixed

Rugby sevens

Men's tournament

Chile qualified a men's team (of 12 athletes) as hosts.

Summary

Women's tournament

Chile qualified a women's team (of 12 athletes) as hosts.

Summary

Sailing

Chile has qualified 13 boats for a total of 19 sailors as hosts. Besides, Chile qualified 1 extra sailor after winning one category during the 2021 Junior Pan American Games. 

Men

Women

Mixed

Shooting

Chile automatically qualified five shooters (two in pistol, two in rifle and one in shotgun) as hosts.
Chile qualified 10 shooters in the 2022 Americas Shooting Championships. Chile also qualified two shooters in the 2022 South American Games.

Men
Pistol and rifle

Shotgun

Women
Pistol and rifle

Shotgun

Softball

Chile qualified a women's team (of 18 athletes) as hosts.

Summary

Sport climbing

Chile qualified a team of four athletes (two men and two women) as hosts.

Squash

Chile qualified a full team of six athletes (three men and three women) as hosts.

Men

Women

Surfing

Chile qualified a full team of ten athletes (five men and five women) as hosts.

Artistic

Race

Swimming

Chile qualified 38 swimmers (19 men and 19 women) as hosts. Besides, Chile qualified 1 extra male swimmer after winning one event during the 2021 Junior Pan American Games.

Men

Women

Mixed

Table tennis

Chile qualified a full team of six athletes (three men and three women) as hosts. 

Men

Women

Mixed

Taekwondo

Chile has qualified a full team of 10 athletes (five men and five women) as hosts. 

Kyorugi

Men

Women

Poomsae

Tennis

Chile qualified a full team of six athletes (three men and three women) as hosts. 

Men

Women

Mixed

Triathlon

Chile qualified a triathlon team of four athletes (two men and two women) as hosts. 

Mixed relay

Volleyball

Beach

Chile qualified a men's and women's pair for a total of four athletes as hosts.

Indoor

Men's tournament

Chile qualified a men's team (of 12 athletes) as hosts.

Summary

Women's tournament

Chile qualified a women's team (of 12 athletes) as hosts.

Summary

Water polo

Men's tournament

Chile qualified a men's team (of 11 athletes) as hosts.

Summary

Women's tournament

Chile qualified a women's team (of 11 athletes) as hosts.

Summary

Water skiing

Chile qualified two wakeboarders (one of each gender) as hosts. 

Chile also qualified four water skiers as hosts. 

Men

Women

Wakeboard
Men

Women

Weightlifting

Chile qualified a team of 8 weightlifters (4 men and 4 women) as hosts.

Wrestling

Chile qualified a full team of 18 wrestlers (12 men and 6 women) as hosts.

Men

Women

See also
Chile at the 2024 Summer Olympics

References

Nations at the 2023 Pan American Games
2023
2023 in Chilean sport